Barranqueras is a city in the southeast of the province of Chaco, Argentina, on a small tributary river on the right-hand-side (western) shore of the Paraná River, only 7 km from the provincial capital Resistencia and within its metropolitan area.

Barranqueras is located in a commercial node of the Mercosur, and has a port on Kilometer 1,198 of the Paraná, managed by the provincial state since 1991.

Alicia Azula was elected Mayor of Barranqueras in 2003 and she was re-elected twice more.

References

 
 Barranqueras in the Spanish Wikipedia
 Puertos de Argentina
 Puerto Barranqueras

Populated places in Chaco Province
Paraná River
Cities in Argentina
Argentina